Andreas Ravelli (born 13 August 1959) is a Swedish former footballer who played as a central defender. He played primarily for Öster and IFK Göteborg during a club career that spanned between 1977 and 1996. A full international between 1980 and 1989, he won 41 caps and scored two goals for the Sweden national team.

He is the twin brother of Thomas Ravelli.

Club career
Born in Vimmerby, Ravelli started playing professionally for Östers IF, lasting 11 seasons with the team and winning two Allsvenskan titles before signing for IFK Göteborg.

At age 31, he moved to amateur football, representing Lenhovda IF – two stints – and Hovmantorp until his retirement (he also represented Östers in between). Later, he also worked as manager of his main club.

International career
Ravelli won 41 caps for Sweden, his debut coming on 12 November 1980 in a 0–0 away draw against Israel for the 1982 FIFA World Cup qualifiers. He never participated in any international tournament, however.

Personal life
Ravelli's twin brother, Thomas, is also a former footballer. Their father was an Austrian immigrant of Italian descent who moved to Sweden in 1952, and the siblings played alongside each other in Öster and the national team as well as one year in Göteborg.

References

External links

Svensk Fotboll profile 

1959 births
Living people
Swedish twins
Swedish people of Austrian descent
Swedish people of Italian descent
Twin sportspeople
Swedish footballers
Association football defenders
Allsvenskan players
Östers IF players
IFK Göteborg players
Lenhovda IF players
Sweden under-21 international footballers
Sweden international footballers
Swedish football managers
Östers IF managers